The Final Payment is a 1917 American silent drama film directed by Frank Powell and starring Nance O'Neil, Jane Miller and Clifford Bruce.

Cast
 Nance O'Neil as Nina 
 Jane Miller as Rose, Her Sister 
 Clifford Bruce as Cesare 
 Leslie Austin as Neccola 
 Alfred Hickman as Alfredo 
 Dorothy Bernard as Marie

References

Bibliography
 Solomon, Aubrey. The Fox Film Corporation, 1915-1935: A History and Filmography. McFarland, 2011.

External links
 

1917 films
1917 drama films
1910s English-language films
American silent feature films
Silent American drama films
American black-and-white films
Films directed by Frank Powell
Fox Film films
1910s American films